Insanity Streak is an Australian daily gag cartoon comic strip created by Tony Lopes. It featuring gags based on small moments in life and has no central characters. First appearing in 1995, it is distributed in over twenty countries, and received the Stanley Award from the Australian Cartoonist's Association in October 2007.

References

 https://issuu.com/australiancartoonists/docs/inkspot54
 https://www.thestar.com.my/lifestyle/people/2015/02/01/australian-cartoonist-bags-his-10th-stanley-award/
 https://www.coffscoastadvocate.com.au/news/meet-creator-of-insanity-streak-tony-lopes/808811/
 http://www.cartoonists.org.au/stanleys
 https://www.theleader.com.au/story/2733483/top-award-for-cartoonist-steve-lopes/#slide=2
 http://www.websterworld.com/websterworld/aust/s/stanleyawards442.html
 http://classic.tcj.com/international/2010-stanley-award-winners/
 https://www.smh.com.au/entertainment/books/similar-is-not-the-same-to-the-discerning-reader-20051105-gdmdja.html
 http://coffscoast.focusmag.com.au/338/

Australian comic strips
Gag cartoon comics
Gag-a-day comics
1995 comics debuts